The 2018 Big West Conference men's soccer season is the 36th consecutive season of men's college soccer in the Big West Conference under the 2018 NCAA Division I men's soccer season. The season will feature eight teams, where one is an affiliate member of the conference. Sacramento State will compete from the Big Sky Conference. Colleges in the Big West will begin competition on August 24, 2018, and conclude on November 9, 2018 after the 2018 NCAA Division I Men's Soccer Championship. Prior to the NCAA Division I Tournament Championship, there will be a postseason conference tournament held at the university with the highest seed in the postseason conference tournament, where the winner is guaranteed to represent the Big West in the NCAA Division I Tournament. Hawaii and Long Beach State have defunct programs in this season.

Rankings

Matches

 Note: Results updated after the last game of each day in WAC competition, and games are added/updated weekly after each rankings release
 Rankings are from the United Soccer Coaches Poll

Non–conference

Records against other conferences

 Note: Conferences eligible for the 2018 NCAA Division I Men's Soccer Championship only

References

2018 NCAA Division I men's soccer season